Williston Basin Pipeline is a natural gas pipeline system which moves gas between Wyoming, Montana, South Dakota, and North Dakota.  It is owned by MDU Resources Group.  Its FERC code is 49.

See also
List of North American natural gas pipelines

References

External links
Pipeline Electronic Bulletin Board

Natural gas pipelines in the United States
Natural gas pipelines in Montana
Natural gas pipelines in North Dakota
Natural gas pipelines in Wyoming
Natural gas pipelines in South Dakota